The Battle of Stallupönen, fought between Russian and German armies on August 17, 1914, was the opening battle of World War I on the Eastern Front. The Germans under the command of Hermann von François conducted a successful counterattack against four Russian infantry divisions from different infantry corps, which heavily outnumbered them but were separated from each other, creating a gap between the 27th Infantry Division and the 40th Infantry Division, and had little coordination with each other. It was a minor German success, but did little to upset the Russian timetable.

Prelude
According to Prit Buttar, "The Dual Alliance and Franco-Russian Treaty, and the obligations contained within them, would prove to be major mechanisms in the outbreak of war in 1914.  The obligations of interlocking treaties now imposed themselves upon the plans and intentions of the military commanders.  Russia had mobilised with a view to attacking Austria-Hungary in support of Serbia, but as German mobilisation would result in a major attack on France, the Russians had to devote the main strength of their regular army to launching an early attack on East Prussia in an attempt to draw off German troops from the Western Front."  Germany's attack on France followed the Schlieffen Plan, a flanking advance through Belgium, with limited forces opposing Russia until a rapid victory over France freed up troops for the Eastern Front.  France was counting on an early Russian attack on Germany, forcing the German redeployment of troops from the Western Front.  Likewise, Russia was optimistic a quick attack on East Prussia to the Vistula would be decisive, allowing Russia to attack Galicia.

Russia deployed the First Army, commanded by Paul von Rennenkampf, and the Second Army, commanded by Alexander Samsonov, for the attack.  Combined Russian forces consisted of 208 infantry battalions, and over 9 cavalry divisions with 192 squadrons.  The First Army would attack north of the Masurian Lakes, while the Second Army attacked from the south.  Germany defended East Prussia with the Eighth Army, commanded by Maximilian von Prittwitz, consisting of 100 battalions, supported by reserve and Landwehr formations.  German defenses included fortifications along the Masurian Lakes, the Königsberg fortifications, and the Toruń Fortress.

Anticipating that the Russians would attack north of the Rominter Heath, then west along the Pregel Valley, Prittwitz ordered Hermann von François' First Corps to take up positions along the Angerapp river.  However, François advocated a forward defense, and by 13 August, had advanced his corps along a line from Gołdap to Stallupönen, 32 km east of his orders.  On 15 August Rennenkampf crossed the border with 6 infantry divisions, intending to follow the railway through Stallupönen and Gumbinnen.

The Battle
On 15 August, François' men encountered First Army's reconnaissance units northeast of Stallupönen, and captured Eydtkuhnen that night as the Russians withdrew. On 16 August, Prittwitz ordered François back to the Gumbinnen as he moved the Eighth Army to the Angerapp, after his Flieger Abteilung 16 reconnaissance flight spotted the Second Army concentrating. However, François kept his 1st Infantry Division at Stallupönen, and his 2nd Infantry Division divided between Galdap and Tollmingkehmen.

On 17 August, Rennenkampf advanced with all three of his infantry corps, but in an uncoordinated fashion. His cavalry was to the north, while the XX Corps, with the 28th and 29th Infantry Divisions, north of the road, and the III Corps, with the 25th and 27th Infantry Divisions on the road and south of it. The IV Corps, with the 40th and 30th Infantry Divisions were advancing on the Rominte Heath further south. François called up General Adalbert von Falk's 2nd Infantry Division in Tollmingkehmen, and his howitzers in Gumbinnen, to reinforce his position in Stallupönen as the battle intensified by mid-day. At 1 PM, Prittwitz's envoy arrived, and ordered François to retreat to Gumbinnen. François' reply was to "Tell General von Prittwitz that General von François will break off the engagement when the Russians are defeated." As Falk advanced, he was able to attack the flank of the Russian 27th Infantry Division near Göritten, when a gap formed between the Russian 27th and 40th Infantry Divisions.

A furious frontal attack broke the Russian division, which fled eastward, losing 3,000 casualties and 5,000 prisoners, including almost the entirety of the Russian 105th Regiment. Although the Russian 29th and 25th Divisions achieved some success to the north of Stallupönen and captured several captives and guns, they couldn't change the outcome of the battle.

Aftermath
François decided not to pursue the Russians, and instead ordered a withdrawal to Gumbinnen as ordered.  Prittwitz, capitalizing on François' success, moved his forces forward, while François held Gumbinnen.

References

Sources

Conflicts in 1914
Battles of World War I involving Russia
Battles of World War I involving Germany
Battles of the Eastern Front (World War I)
East Prussia
History of Kaliningrad Oblast
1914 in the Russian Empire
1914 in Germany
August 1914 events
Germany–Russia relations